Maroth is a village located in Nawa, Nagaur district, in the state of Rajasthan, India. The area surrounding the village is named Gaurati, which means "The Land of Gaurs". This area was a principality granted by Maharaja Vigharaj Chauhan to Maharaja Bawan Gaur in 1260 AD. In 1659 AD, it was granted by Aurangzeb to Maharaja Raghunath Singh for his service in battle. During this time period the Gaur Rajputs of this area paid more than 6.65% of the Jama (tax) of the principality according to Ain-A-Akbari.

The village draws tourists because of its archaeological sites and interest. A total of 1,417 families live in the village, which has a population of 8,330 of which 4,344 are males and 3,986 are females according to the Indian Census of 2011.

Location
Maroth is located along State Highway Number 19, which links Jodhpur to Jaipur. Maroth has one bus stop which connects the village to Kuchaman City and a railway station near the village in which trains going to Jodhpur from Jaipur stop.

History

In the Hammira mahakavya of Nayachandrasuri{14th century A.D.), its name is mentioned as Maharashtra- nagara. This Sanskritised name was used even up to the eighteenth century A.D. as is clear from the epigraphical and  In Apabharihsa, it was known as Maharotha. 

As Maroth is surrounded by hills, the ruling chiefs, seeing 
its strategical position, selected it for constructing forts. It is said that in the beginning, it was ruled by the Rajput clans
such as the Chandellas, the Daliyas and the Dahiyas, who were all feudatories of the Chauhanas. It is believed that first, it was under the possession of the Chandellas. As the Chandellas were ruling over Revasa, a place near Maroth, in the eleventh and twelfth centuries as feudatories of the Chauhanas of Ajmer, it is not improbable that they might be also governing Maroth. Afterwards, it was probably ruled by the Dahiyas, a branch of the Chauhanas founded by Dala.

Then, Maroth was ruled by the Gaurs, who probably seized it from the Dahiyas. Maroth, and villages round it are still called Gaudati on account of their having been held by the Gaurs. It is said that Vachchharaja and Vamana, the ancestors of 
Gauda Rajputs came to Ajmer in the time of Prithviraja Chauhana III. In course of time, their descendants seized Maroth from the Dahiyas and began to rule over both at Maroth and Rajgarh, near Ajmer. 

No definite information of the early Gaur rulers is available.During the reign of Jahangir, Gopaladasa the ruling chief of this place, was made Kiledar of Asera. He and his son Vikrama were killed in a battle of Thadha, which they fought in favour of Khuram (Shahjahan) against Jahangir. 

After him, his son Bithaladasa, who was the most powerful ruler of this dynasty, became a ruler.He was made Hakim of Ranthambore in1630 A.D. by Shahjahan. After the death of Vajirkhan,Shahjahan appointed him as a Subedar and Kiledar of Agra in 1640 A.D. His near relative Biharldasa, in 1639 A.D., gave directions to the revenue collectors of Maroth known as Chaudharis, to rehabilitate the deserted Paraganas and emphasized,” As you serve, so shall you get the reward.”After him, his son Arjuna extended his kingdom because Malpura, now in Jaipur District, was ruled by him.It is clear from a Jaina inscription of 1653 A.D. (V.S. 1710) that Lalachanda performed a big installation ceremony of images at Malpura during the reign of Arjuna Gaur through Bhatfdraka Chandrakirti. Malpura was probably taken by him from the Kachhavahas of Amber.

The Gaurs were fond of buildings, and as such, they constructed fort and palaces at this place, the remains of which are still traceable. The temple of Lakshmlnarayana on the hill, which seems to be of the fourteenth century A,D. from the architectural point of view, is said to have been built by some Gaur chief. This temple was repaired from time to time. Though its major part has fallen, its old pillars and sikhara are still surviving. The Saiva temple is also attributed to them. A big garden, known as Naulakha with the income of nine lakhs was erected by these Gaur rulers. 

The Gaur rajputs ruled the region around Maroth for centuries. Over the course of history, they increased their influence and expanded their kingdom. The Gaur people fought alongside the Amber Kingdom early in their history. In the early 16th century, a man named Riddmal became the ruler of Maroth and the leader of the Gaur rulers of the region. Riddmal was a military commander of the Gaurs and fought several battles against local rival Rao Shekha, consolidating all the Gaur people under his control and killing Shekha. However, Riddmal was forced to enter into a treaty with Raymal, the son of Rao Shekha.

The Gaurs of Maroth maintained a good relationship with Shah Jahan during his reign. They were influential in the early years of the Delhi Durbar, but lost much of their power in the assembly during Aurangzeb's era. Despite this weakness, the Gaurs were still able to resist an attack by Raghunath Singh Mertiya. Still, some of the Gaurs relocated to other villages outside of Maroth, such as Alwar, Jhunjhunu, Ajmer, Jaipur, Jodhpur, and Sopra.

Thakurs 

 Kunwar Rao Ajay Singh (1497-1537)
 Rao Man Singh (1537-1542)
 Rao Pan Singh (1542-1559)
 Rao Josal Singh (1559-1580)
Rao Kanha Deo (1580-1584)
Rao Satal Singh (1584-1590)
Rao Suja Singh (1590-1632)
Rao Keshav Das (1632-1667)
Rao Amar Das Singh (1667-1702)
Gulab Singh
 Hari Singh
Kan Singh
Anand Singh

References

Villages in Nagaur district